The following is a list of presently-operating bus transit systems in Finland with regular service. The list excludes charter buses and private bus operators, but includes demand-responsive transport systems.

See also
Transport in Finland

Bus transport in Finland
Finland transport-related lists